Jyväskylä TV-mast is a mast in Taka-Keljo, Jyväskylä, Finland.

See also
List of tallest structures in Finland

References

Communication towers in Finland
Jyväskylä
Transmitter sites in Finland
Buildings and structures in Central Finland
1994 establishments in Finland
Towers completed in 1994